Picking Up the Pieces is the twelfth studio album from American singer-songwriter Jewel, released on September 11, 2015, through Sugar Hill Records. Self-produced, the album is said to be a bookend to her 1995 debut album, Pieces of You.

Background and writing
The announcement for the album came on July 1, 2015, as part of Jewel's monthly "EDA INCLUSIVE" series on her website. In the same post she describes the writing process:
"My focus for this CD was to forget everything I have learned about the music business the last 20 years and get back to what my bones have to say about songs and words and feeling and meaning...It took real effort to clear my thoughts and have no rules and just create - going back to my folk/American roots that I began with."

The album features new material as well as songs Jewel has been playing live since the mid-nineties but never recorded. One of the new tracks, "My Father's Daughter," is a collaboration with Dolly Parton.

Production
Jewel originally hired Paul Worley to produce the album, but he backed out about a week before rehearsals insisting that she produce it herself and suggesting she will thank him later for the idea.

Jewel wanted to capture a live sound for the album. Portions of it were recorded during a set at The Standard in Nashville, while others were captured during a live performance in front of friends in Nashville's historic RCA Studio A. They were done in one take, with "no overdubs, no layering tracks, no auto-tune or tricks," according to Jewel. She describes the overall sound as "minimal, focusing on the singing, lyric, and emotion."

Jeff Balding, who engineered Jewel's 2001 album This Way, is credited with engineering the full band songs on the album, while the acoustic tracks were engineered by Erik Hellerman. The entire album was mixed by Gary Paczosa.

Release
The album's lead single, "My Father's Daughter," was "released" on August 14, 2015.

Picking Up the Pieces was released on September 11, 2015, through Sugar Hill Records.

Critical reception

Picking Up the Pieces has received mostly positive reviews from music critics. AllMusic's Stephen Thomas Erlewine rated the album three and a half out of five stars and states: "her decision to return to the (Pieces of You) form but not the sensibility of her earlier music is what makes Picking Up the Pieces a successful neo-comeback." Marcus Floyd from Renowned for Sound rated the album four and a half out of five stars and claims: "Jewel’s voice hasn’t been heard this raw for 20 years, it shines throughout the entire album," and that "Jewel has successfully returned to her roots, and her fans will thank her for it."

Track listing

Charts

Release history

References

2015 albums
Jewel (singer) albums
Sugar Hill Records albums